John Selman (fl. 1414–1435) of Plympton Erle and Portworthy, Devon, was an English politician.

Family
Selman was the (probably illegitimate) son of another Plympton Erle MP, John Selman I.

Career
He was a Member (MP) of the Parliament of England for Plympton Erle in November 1414, 1420, May 1421, December 1421, 1425, 1427, 1431, 1432, 1433 and 1435.

References

14th-century births
15th-century deaths
English MPs November 1414
English MPs 1420
English MPs May 1421
English MPs December 1421
English MPs 1425
English MPs 1427
English MPs 1431
English MPs 1432
English MPs 1433
English MPs 1435
Members of the Parliament of England for Plympton Erle